The Goit (sometimes written The Goyt) (see Oxford English Dictionary - Gote - a watercourse; any channel for water; a stream. Chiefly northern dialect.)  is a canal used for transporting drinking water along the Rivington chain in Lancashire, England.  The section in Brinscall is currently covered, and a local campaign is ongoing to attempt to uncover the water. The Goit is now uncovered from Brinscall down to Anglezarke, passing through White Coppice, a path follows its course the whole way on either side.

External links 
 GREAT (Goit River Environment Action Team)

Drinking water reservoirs in England
Geography of Chorley
Reservoirs in Lancashire